Winzavod (Vinzavod, literally winery) is a centre for contemporary arts in Moscow, Russia.
Opened in 2007, it is located in a complex of seven industrial buildings from the late 19th century including the former brewery (and later winery) called "Moscow Bavaria". Alexander Brodsky is the coordinator of the project.

Estate of Princess Volkonskaya

Captain of the Guards regiment Mel’gunov, the first owner of a large estate situated in modern Mruzovskomu on the corner 4th streets BANKS, sold his estate to his own sister, Princess Catherine Volkonskaya. She was an outstanding Moscow lady and mistress of the Sukhanov Moscow region, and she had the nickname "Aunt Warrior" for her decisive power over her nephew, Peter Volkonsky, the Chief of Staff of Kutuzov. 

In 1805, Monin bought the manor. After four years in 1810, Nicephorus Prokofiev opened a malt-brewing factory on its territory. In early 1821, the estate passed on to Revel shopkeeper Frederick Danielson of the 2nd Guild, who added a wing to the residential part of the building, along with a two-story brewery and malt house. Kokorev collected paintings and was a patron of the arts: in the gallery, which he established in 1861, he placed more than 500 paintings.

Moscow Bavaria

In the middle of the 19th century, the western part of the estate was cut off by the Moscow-Kursk railway. The malt building was on the corner of the newly paved lane and unexpectedly increased in urban value. The brewery kept all of its buildings. In the 1870s through the 1880s, brothers Ivan and Cyril Tarusin, the owners of “Moscow Bavaria” (Russian company for beer and mead in Moscow), acquired the factory. In 1909, part of the estate was acquired by legal representatives of the honorable H. S. Ledentsov, who used his resources for educational purposes; the main house was converted into a four-year college.

Modern history

Businessman Roman Trotsenko founded the Winzavod Center for Contemporary Art. Lina Krasnyanskaya, who headed Winzavod's flagship Best of Russia project, became the executive director in 2016.

References

Buildings and structures in Moscow
Arts centres
Arts in Moscow
Art museums and galleries in Moscow
Contemporary art galleries in Russia
Breweries
Wineries of Russia
Cultural heritage monuments of regional significance in Moscow